

Events 
April 8 Johann Sebastian Bach performs a copy he made of the Brockes Passion HWV 48 of George Frideric Handel at St. Thomas Church, Leipzig.
Elias Gottlob Haussmann completes his famous portrait of Johann Sebastian Bach
1746–1747 Bach adds two Chorale preludes (BWV 664 and 665) to his manuscript of the Great Eighteen Chorale Preludes.

Classical music 
Carl Philipp Emanuel Bach 
Harpsichord Concerto in A major, H.422
Harpsichord Concerto in C major, H.423
Viola da Gamba Sonata in D major, H.559
Johann Sebastian Bach 
Sechs Choräle von verschiedener Art
Canon in G major, BWV 1076
Francesco Feo – S. Francesco di Sales (sacred oratorio) first performed
Francesco Geminiani 
6 Cello Sonatas, Op. 5
6 Concertos, Op.7
 Christoph Willibald Gluck – 6 Trio Sonatas, Wq.53
Christoph Graupner – Ach Herr, mich armen Suender (cantata)
 Joannes de Gruytters – his carillon book.
 George Frideric Handel 
Occasional Oratorio, HWV 62 with words by Newburgh Hamilton
Concerto in D major, HWV 335a (contributed to the Music for the Royal Fireworks)
Niccolò Pasquali – Sonatas for two cellos
Giovanni Benedetto Platti – 6 Harpsichord Sonatas, Op. 4 (parts of which have been attributed to Benedetto Marcello)
Joseph-Nicolas-Pancrace Royer – Pièces de clavecin
Rudolf Straube – 2 Lute Sonatas
Giuseppe Tartini – 3 Violin Concertos, Libro 1

Opera
Andrea Adolfati – La pace fra la virtù e la bellezza
Thomas Arne – Neptune and Amphitrite
Matteo Capranica – Alcibiade
Carl Heinrich Graun – Demofoonte, GraunWV B:I:13
Niccolò Jommelli – Didone abbandonata
Jean-Marie Leclair – Scylla et Glaucus

Publications 

 Burke Thumoth – 12 English and 12 Irish Airs with Variations (London: J. Simpson)
Anonymous – The Compleat Tutor for the French Horn (London: John Simpson)

Methods and theory writings 

 William Tans'ur – A New Musical Grammar

Births 
January 11 – František Adam Míča, Czech composer (died 1811)
January 23 – Pierre-Ulric Dubuisson, translator and actor (died 1794)
February 13 – Giuseppe Maria Cambini, Italian composer (died 1825)
April 4 – Alexandre-Louis Robineau, librettist (died 1823)
June 2– Wilhelm Cramer, composer and violinist (died 1799)
June 3 (probable) – James Hook (composer), composer (died 1827)
June 29 – Joachim Heinrich Campe, German librettist (died 1818)
July 2 – Hartenack Otto Conrad Zinck, Danish composer (died 1832) 
August 21 – Ignaz Umlauf, Austrian composer (died 1796)
September 3 – Friedrich Wilhelm Gotter, librettist and poet (died 1797) 
September 20 – Christian Benjamin Uber, German composer (died 1812)
September 26 – Giovanni Punto, composer and horn player (died 1803)
October 4 – Domenico Corri, Italian composer (died 1825)
October 7 – William Billings, American composer (died 1800)
October 12 – Emerico Lobo de Mesquita, composer and collaborator (died 1805) 
October 22 – Hector Macneill, librettist and poet (died 1818)
 November 15 – Joseph Quesnel, composer (died 1809)
December 19 – Venanzio Rauzzini, collector and opera singer (died 1810)
December 21 – Ludwig Christoph Heinrich Hölty, librettist and poet (died 1776) 
 unknown date - Avdotya Mikhaylova, opera singer (died 1807)

Deaths 
March 16 – Jean Baptiste Matho, French composer (born 1663)
March 30 – Jean-Joseph Fiocco, composer (b. 1686) 
May 15 – Giovanni Antonio Ricieri, composer 
August 27 – Johann Caspar Ferdinand Fischer, German composer
October 14 – Domenico Alberti, Italian composer (born c. 1700)
December 6 – Grizel Baillie, librettist and composer (born 1665)
December 10 – Teodorico Pedrini, priest, musician and composer (b. 1671) 
unknown date – Jean-Baptiste Malter, dancer (b. 1701)

References

 
18th century in music
Music by year